In mathematics, the Gauss–Kuzmin distribution is a discrete probability distribution that arises as the limit probability distribution of the coefficients in the continued fraction expansion of a random variable uniformly distributed in (0, 1). The distribution is named after Carl Friedrich Gauss, who derived it around 1800, and Rodion Kuzmin, who gave a bound on the rate of convergence in 1929. It is given by the probability mass function

Gauss–Kuzmin theorem

Let

be the continued fraction expansion of a random number x uniformly distributed in (0, 1). Then

Equivalently, let

then

tends to zero as n tends to infinity.

Rate of convergence

In 1928, Kuzmin gave the bound

In 1929, Paul Lévy improved it to

Later, Eduard Wirsing showed that, for λ = 0.30366... (the Gauss–Kuzmin–Wirsing constant), the limit

exists for every s in [0, 1], and the function Ψ(s) is analytic and satisfies Ψ(0) = Ψ(1) = 0. Further bounds were proved by K. I. Babenko.

See also
 Khinchin's constant
 Lévy's constant

References

Continued fractions
Discrete distributions